When Dreams Come True (1913 film)
 When Dreams Come True (1929 film)